The Westward Trail is a 1948 American Western film directed by Ray Taylor and written by Robert Alan Miller. The film stars Eddie Dean, Roscoe Ates, Phyllis Planchard, Eileene Hardin, Steve Drake and Bob Duncan. The film was released on March 13, 1948, by Producers Releasing Corporation.

Plot

Cast          
Eddie Dean as Eddie Dean
Roscoe Ates as Soapy Jones
Phyllis Planchard as Ann Howard
Eileene Hardin as Mrs. Benson
Steve Drake as Tom Howard
Bob Duncan as Chuck Larson
Carl Mathews as Art Hardin
Lee Morgan as Sheriff Buck McNeal
Bob Woodward as Stage Driver
Budd Buster as Benson
Slim Whitaker as Bartender 
Frank Ellis as Taggart
Andy Parker as Andy Parker
Copper the Horse as Eddie's Horse

References

External links
 

1948 films
American Western (genre) films
1948 Western (genre) films
Producers Releasing Corporation films
Films directed by Ray Taylor
American black-and-white films
1940s English-language films
1940s American films